William Robison (14 December 1874 – 5 July 1916) was an Australian cricketer. He played one first-class match for New South Wales in 1893/94.

See also
 List of New South Wales representative cricketers

References

External links
 

1874 births
1916 deaths
Australian cricketers
New South Wales cricketers
Cricketers from Sydney